Bravo, My Life is a 2022 South Korean television series starring Nam Sang-ji, Yang Byung-yeol, Lee Si-gang and Cha Min-ji. The series directed by Seong Jun-hae, revolves around Seo Dong-hee, a single mother who chooses to be her nephew's mother. It also depicts her struggle  during course of life. The daily drama premiered on KBS1 on April 11, 2022 and aired on every weekday at 20:30 (KST) for 120 episodes.

Cast and characters

Main
 Nam Sang-ji as Seo Dong-hee
27 years old, a single mother who chooses to become  mother of her nephew.
 Yang Byung-yeol as Kang Cha-yeol
A second-generation chaebol with  brains and looks. After his father passed away, he was adopted by his uncle In-gyu.
 Lee Si-gang as Kang Seong-wook, the only son of the second-generation Inha fashion conglomerate.
 Cha Min-ji as Baek Seung-joo, a college friend having a crush on Kang Cha-yeol and the marketing manager of Inha Fashion.

Supporting

Dong-hee family
 Lee Han-wi as Kim Jeong-ho
 61 years old, Seo Dong-hee's uncle, Seo Him-Chan’s grand uncle, Kim Hye-na's grandfather.
 Kim Hee-jung as Seo Myeong-sook
59 years old, Seo Dong-hee's aunt, Seo Him-Chan’s grand aunt, Kim Hye-na's grandmother.  
 Lim Chae-won as Kim Jong-un 
 47 years old, she has spent 10 years as a committed playwright. 
  as Kim Tae-pyung
33 years old, divorced, he has an easygoing personality and life. Seo Dong-hee’s Cousin, Kim Jeong-ho & Seo Myeong-sook‘s Son.
 Hong Ah-reum as Park Ja-young
33 years old, after divorce from Tae-Pyung, she is a single mother raising a daughter. She runs a beauty salon and works day and night with the determination to raise her daughter Hye-na as good as anyone else.
 Kim Ha-yeon as Kim Hye-na
13 years old, Tae-pyung and Jae-young's daughter. Seo Him-Chan’s once-removed-cousin.
 Kim Young-ok as Seo Dong-hee's grandmother and Myungsook's mother.
Seol Jung-hwan as Seo Jae-seok 
Seo Dong-hee's older brother, he has deep brotherly friendship with her. He is a student preparing for the bar exam.
Kim Si-woo as Seo Him-chan 
Donghee's nephew, Jae-seok and Seung-joo's son. Kim Jeong-ho & Seo Myeong-sook’s Grandnephew. Kim Hye-na’s once-removed-cousin.

Inha family
 Sunwoo Jae-duk as Kang In-gyu :60 years old, representative of 'In-ha Fashion' and Kang Seong-wook's father.
 Park Hae-mi as Choi Mi Kyung
59 years old, wife of Kang In-gyu and Kang Seong-wook's mother.

Others
 Jo Mi-ryung as Bang Hye-ran, mother of Baek Seung-joo. She lived strong because of her husband, but faces a difficult reality due to the bankruptcy of her husband's company.
 Lee Dae-yeon as Jang Hyun-seok, he runs 'Hana Mandu', and a neighbor who is loved for his simple and good looks even though he is very wealthy. He is like a benefactor to Dong-hee (single mother) and a strong supporter.
 Kim Do-kyung as Lee Jong-min, is Seo Dong-hee's colleague.
 Kwon Dong-won as Seo Jae-Seok's friend.
 Kang Hyeon-jung as Jo Ki-ja

Production
Writer Gu Ji-won is writing after three years as Gu last wrote KBS1's daily drama Home for Summer  in 2019. On February 28, it was reported that Yang Byung-yeol was confirmed for the male lead of the series. He takes on the role of a second generation chaebol, who has good brains and a warm-hearted appearance. Nam Sang-ji was confirmed to play female lead in the series. On March 16, it was announced that Lee Si-gang was confirmed for the role of second-generation chaebol character. Cha Min-ji was confirmed to play as head of Inha Fashion Design Marketing. Jo Mi-ryung and Kim Ha-yeon are working together for the second time as they previously appeared in KBS1 daily drama No Matter What aired in 2020.

Original soundtrack

Part 1

Part 2

Part 3

Part 4

Part 5

Part 6

Part 7

Part 8

Part 9

Part 10

Part 11

Part 12

Part 13

Part 14

Part 15

Part 16

Part 17

Part 18

Part 19

Part 20

Part 21

Part 22

Part 23

Part 24

Part 25

Part 26

Part 27

Part 28

Part 29

Part 30

Part 31

Part 32

Part 33

Part 34

Part 35

Part 36

Part 37

Part 38

Part 39

Viewership

Accolades

Notes

References

External links
  
 Bravo, My Life at Naver 
 Bravo, My Life at Daum 
 
 

Korean Broadcasting System television dramas
2022 South Korean television series debuts
2022 South Korean television series endings
Korean-language television shows
South Korean romance television series
South Korean melodrama television series
Television series about families
South Korean romantic comedy television series
Television series about single parent families
Television series by Monster Union